Sir John Hay, 6th Baronet of Smithfield and Haystoun FRSE FSA (3 August 1788 – 1 November 1838) was a British baronet and politician. He sat as a Member of Parliament for Peeblesshire from 1831 to 1837.

He was the son of Sir John Hay, 5th Baronet of Smithfield and Haystoun FRSE (1755–1830), banker and landowner, and Mary Elizabeth Forbes. His brother-in-law was the banker, George Forbes FRSE (1790–1857).

He trained as an advocate and passed the Scottish bar in 1811.

In 1820 he was elected a Fellow of the Royal Society of Edinburgh his proposer being George Forbes.

In 1821 he married Ann Preston (d.1862). They had no children.

References

External links 
 

1788 births
1838 deaths
Members of the Parliament of the United Kingdom for Scottish constituencies
Baronets in the Baronetage of Nova Scotia
UK MPs 1831–1832
UK MPs 1832–1835
UK MPs 1835–1837
Fellows of the Royal Society of Edinburgh